Sadova is a village in Călărași District, Moldova.

Natives
Igor Dodon

References

Villages of Călărași District